This is a list of the executive ministries of India, from the time of its independence to the present day.

List of ministries
"Ministry" refers collectively to all members of the Union Council of Ministers during a given term, including Cabinet Ministers and Ministers of State alike. Articles listed by ministry contain information on the term of one prime minister, specifically the composition of their Council of Ministers.

References

India’s First Cabinet Ministers भारत के पहले कैबिनेट मंत्री

See also
List of prime ministers of India

Lists of governments
 
India government-related lists